Sedum glaucophyllum, the cliff stonecrop, is a species of Sedum native to the Appalachian Mountains in the eastern United States from West Virginia, Maryland, Virginia and North Carolina.

References

Flora of the Eastern United States
Plants described in 1946
glaucophyllum